Phoenix Pick is the science fiction and fantasy imprint of Arc Manor Publishers based in Rockville, Maryland, United States. 

Phoenix Pick publishes many classic and semi-classic works of science fiction and fantasy. These include Dark Universe (1961) and Simulacron-3 (1964) by Daniel F. Galouye, Lest Darkness Fall and Related Stories (1939) by L. Sprague de Camp (with the related stories by Frederik Pohl, David Drake, and S. M. Stirling) and The Long Tomorrow (1955) by Leigh Brackett.

In 2010, Phoenix Pick published two novellas nominated for the Nebula Award: "Act One" by Nancy Kress and '"Arkfall" by Carolyn Gilman. "Act One" was also nominated for the Hugo Award. That year, Phoenix Pick also published Ceres by L. Neil Smith,  a finalist for the Prometheus Award.

Other publications include Alexei and Cory Panshin's Hugo-Award-winning study on science fiction, The World Beyond the Hill (1989) and  the Phoenix Science Fiction Classics series. The series publishes a number of annotated classic texts (with commentary) specifically geared toward college students. PSF Classics is edited by Paul Cook, and authors represented in this series include H. G. Wells and Jules Verne. Additionally, Phoenix Pick promotes Arc Manor's bimonthly Galaxy's Edge magazine.

The Stellar Guild

In July 2011, Phoenix Pick announced The Stellar Guild series. With five-time Hugo Award winner Mike Resnick as editor, the series pairs bestselling science fiction and fantasy authors with lesser known authors to help give them greater visibility. Each writer in the pair contributes a story set in the same universe, specifically written for the series.

The books published through November 2015 are:
Tau Ceti by Kevin J. Anderson with Steven Savile (November 14, 2011) — Story of The Beacon, a generation ship launched from an Earth tearing itself apart from its exhaustive demand for resources and aimed at Sarbras, a habitable planet circling Tau Ceti.
Reboots by Mercedes Lackey and Cody Martin (November 26, 2011) — Follows a mixed crew consisting of zombies, werewolves and vampires in the closed confines of a spacecraft.
On the Train by Harry Turtledove and Rachel Turtledove (September 25, 2012)
When the Blue Shift Comes by Robert Silverberg and Alvaro Zinos-Amaro (October 25, 2012)
New Under the Sun by Nancy Kress and Therese Pieczynski (November 15, 2013)
The Aethers of Mars by Eric Flint and Charles E. Gannon (May 6, 2014)
Red Tide by Larry Niven and Brad R. Torgersen/Matthew J. Harrington (October 15, 2014)
INCI by Mike Resnick and Tina Gower (August 19, 2015)
Wishing on a Star by Jody Lynn Nye and Angelina Adams (November 14, 2015)

Authors published

 Kevin J. Anderson
 Poul Anderson
 A. A. Attanasio
 Edgar Rice Burroughs
 J. F. Bone
 Leigh Brackett
 Marion Zimmer Bradley
 Lois McMaster Bujold
 Terry Gene Carr
 Jack L. Chalker
 Paul Cook
 L. Sprague de Camp
 Arthur Conan Doyle
 David Drake
 Eric Flint
 Michael Flynn
 Daniel F. Galouye
 Carolyn Ives Gilman
 Tom Godwin
 Terence M. Green
 Karen Haber
 Joe Haldeman
 Edmond Hamilton
 Robert A. Heinlein
 Frank Herbert
 James P. Hogan
 Kij Johnson
 Nancy Kress
 Mercedes Lackey
 Jay Lake
 Stephen Leigh
  Edward M. Lerner
 Cody Martin
 A. Merritt
 Larry Niven
 Andre Norton
 Alexei Panshin
 Cory Panshin
 Frederik Pohl
 Mike Resnick
 Steven Savile
 Charles Sheffield
 Mary Shelley
 Joan Slonczewski
 L. Neil Smith
 Christopher Stasheff
 S. M. Stirling
 Victoria Strauss
 Harry Turtledove
 Jules Verne
 Jack Williamson
 Aaron S. Zelman

References

External links
Phoenix Pick (Science Fiction Imprint of Arc Manor)
Arc Manor's official website

American speculative fiction publishers
Book publishing companies based in Maryland
Science fiction publishers
Fantasy book publishers